is a Japanese actress. From 2012, she regularly appears in the ETV science program Science Zero.

Biography
Minamisawa starred in Akai Ito. She appeared in Junji Sakamoto's 2010 film Strangers in the City. She is fluent in Korean.

Filmography

Film
 Walking My Life (2007)
 Akai Ito (2008)
 Yamazakura (2008)
 Shakariki! (2008)
 Kimi ni Love Song o (2010)
 Hachigatsu no Nijusou (2010)
 Strangers in the City (2010)
 Mameshiba Ichiro: Futen no Shiba Jiro (2013)

Television
 Seito Shokun! (2007)
 Shiori to Shimiko no Kaiki Jikenbo (2008)
 Akai Ito (2008)
 1 Pound no Fukuin (2008)
 Kamiji Yusuke Monogatari (2009)
 Dandy Daddy (2009)
 Maigo (2011)
 Koukou Nyushi (2012)
 Suteki na Sen TAXI (2014)
 Gunshi Kanbei (2014)
 Kōnodori (2015)
 Jimi ni Sugoi! Kōetsu Girl: Kouno Etsuko (2016)

Bibliography
 Minamisawa no Kaze (2007)
 Futsu (2009)

Discography
 Ima (2012)

References

External links
 Official website
 

21st-century Japanese actresses
Living people
1990 births
Actors from Saitama Prefecture
Rikkyo University alumni